The Hero of Socialist Labour was an honorary title in Albania and other Warsaw Pact countries. It was the highest degree of distinction for exceptional achievements in national economy and culture. It provided a similar status to the title Hero of the People that was awarded for heroic deeds, but unlike the latter, was awarded to citizens who contributed to the development of Albania's industry, agriculture, transportation, trade, science and technology and promoted the might and the glory of Albania.

The title was introduced by the decree of the Albanian parliament in 1954 and extended to agricultural workers with a law in 1961. Only the Albanian parliament could deprive a person of this title.

See also
Orders, decorations and medals of Albania
Hero of the People

Notes and references
  Full list of honorary titles given in Albania in the 1945-1990 period

Awards established in 1954
Title
1954 establishments in Albania
Hero (title)